Constantinos Panagi (Greek: Κωνσταντίνος Παναγή, born 8 October 1994) is a Cypriot professional footballer, who plays for Omonia, as a goalkeeper

Club career
Panagi is a product of Olympiakos Nicosia academies and in 2010 he was promoted to the men's team by coach Pambos Christodoulou. In 2013-2014 he was the main choice under the goalposts of Olympiakos making 25 league appearances in the Cypriot Second Division. On 20 May 2014 he transferred to another team of the capital Omonia. He made his first team debut on 18 April in a draw with Apollon where he impressed and he is since being always a first team regular for Omonia. His European debut came on the 9th of June in a 2-0 win against Dinamo Batumi.He made 49 league appearances for Omonia ever since joining.

Career statistics

Club

International

Honours
 Omonia
Cypriot First Division: 2020–21
Cypriot Cup: 2021–22
Cypriot Super Cup: 2021

References

External links
 
 

1994 births
Living people
Sportspeople from Nicosia
Cypriot footballers
Cyprus international footballers
Cyprus under-21 international footballers
Cyprus youth international footballers
Cypriot First Division players
Olympiakos Nicosia players
AC Omonia players
Association football goalkeepers